Megalofrea bioculata is a species of beetle in the family Cerambycidae. It was described by Fairmaire in 1889. It is known from Madagascar.

Varietas
 Megalofrea bioculata breuningi (Lepesme & Villiers, 1944)
 Megalofrea bioculata trioculata Breuning, 1942

References

Crossotini
Beetles described in 1889